Tvangeste is a Russian/Canadian symphonic black metal duo composed of husband and wife Mikhail "Miron" Chirva and Naturelle Chirva.

The band's name comes from Twangste (also spelled as Tuwangste, Tvankste or Twankste), an Old Prussian word meaning "Dam". Twangste was also the name of a small Old Prussian village roughly located at what is now the city of Kaliningrad (known as Königsberg until 1946) that was seized in 1255 by the Teutonic Knights. In the site of the settlement, the now-demolished Königsberg Castle was built. (The House of Soviets now stands on the former site of the castle.)

Biography
Tvangeste was formed in 1996 in Kaliningrad, Russia, and its line-up at the time consisted of Miron Chirva, Edgar, Nikolay "Kok" Kazmin and Klaus. However, in the following year, Edgar and Klaus left the band and were replaced by Asmodey and Julia. In 1998 they released two demo singles, Thinking... (that would be later re-recorded and included in their debut album) and Blood Dreams. Asmodey and Julia would leave shortly after, being replaced by Viktoria Kulbachnaya (from Romowe Rikoito) and Vano Mayarov (also known as Vanoe Mayoroff or Mayorov). With this line-up, Tvangeste released their debut full-length in 2000, Damnation of Regiomontum, via now-defunct Norwegian record label Valgarder.

In 2001, Miron's then-girlfriend Naturelle joined the band, and in 2003 their second studio album, Firestorm, was released, via also now-defunct Japanese label Worldchaos Production. Polish musician Cezary Mielko worked as a session drummer on it. Also in 2003, Max Naumov joined the band, and Tvangeste became a quintet.

In 2005, Miron and Naturelle married and moved to Niagara Falls, Ontario, Canada, while the three remaining members decided to stay in Russia. Around the same time Miron also provided vocals for Israeli black metal band Arafel's second studio album, Second Strike: Through the Flame of the Ages.

Since 2006 Miron and Naturelle are working on Tvangeste's third studio album. Tentatively titled Satori (Japanese for "Illumination"), it was scheduled to be released via their own independent record label, Regiomontum Productions. Norwegian musician Jørn Øyhus served as a session drummer, and the orchestral instrumentation was provided by the City of Prague Philharmonic Orchestra, according to Miron. Having a long and convoluted production history, it currently has no set release date.

The band's song "Birth of the Hero" was featured in the soundtrack of the 2009 video game Brütal Legend.

In February 2013, Miron was interviewed for Attention! Black Metal!, a Hungarian documentary that focuses on symphonic black metal bands.

On 7 September 2016 the band announced on their official Facebook page the death of their former bassist/guitarist, Vano Mayarov.

Discography

Demo tapes
 Blood Dreams (1997)
 Thinking... (1998)

Studio albums
 Damnation of Regiomontum (2000)
 Firestorm (2003)

Band members

Current members
 Mikhail "Miron" Chirva (Михаил "Мирон" Чирва) – vocals, guitars, orchestral arrangements (1996–)
 Naturelle Chirva (Натюрель Чирва) – keyboards, vocals, orchestral arrangements (2001–)

Former members
 Edgar (Эдгар) – guitars (1996–1998)
 Klaus (Клаус) – guitars (1996–1997)
 Nikolay "Kok" Kazmin (Николай "Кок" Казьмин) – guitars (1996–2005)
 Asmodey (Асмодей) – drums (1997–1998)
 Julia (Юлия) – keyboards (1997–1998)
 Viktoria Kulbachnaya (Виктория Кульбачная) – keyboards (1998–2005)
 Ivan "Vano" Mayorov (Иван Майоров) – bass, guitar (1998–2005; died 2016)
 Max Naumov (Макс Наумов) – bass (2003–2005)

Session members
 Cezary Mielko – drums (2003)
 Jørn Øyhus – drums (2014)

References

External links
 
 Regiomontum Productions' official website

1996 establishments in Russia
Canadian black metal musical groups
Canadian musical duos
Kaliningrad
Musical groups established in 1996
Musical groups from Niagara Falls, Ontario
Russian black metal musical groups
Russian musical duos
Symphonic black metal musical groups